Sphaeromorda natalensis is a species of beetle in the genus Sphaeromorda of the family Mordellidae, which is part of the superfamily Tenebrionoidea. It was described in 1950 by Franciscolo.

References

Beetles described in 1950
Mordellidae